Monasterio de San Salvador may refer to:

 Monasterio de San Salvador (Celanova)
 Monasterio de San Salvador (Celorio)
 Monasterio de San Salvador (Cornellana)